Eva Bolander is a Scottish National Party (SNP) politician. She sits as a councillor for the Anderston/City/Yorkhill ward, having first been elected in a by-election in 2015.

She was the Lord Provost of Glasgow, elected in May 2017, the first member of the SNP to hold this post.

In October 2019, she came under scrutiny for spending on shoes, clothes and cosmetics. The £8,000 she spent over 28-months in office was within the £5,000 annual allowance but it was still considered excessive by some of the public. The day after the figures were published, Bolander apologised, stating "Although the spending incurred was within the rules, on reflection there are items which I should not have chosen to reclaim" and stated that she would repay some of the money. In the wake of the criticism over her expenses claims, Bolander resigned as Lord Provost on 30 October 2019.

Personal life
Born and brought up in Stockholm, Sweden, Bolander moved to Glasgow after the accession of Sweden to the EU in 1995. She had first visited Glasgow in the 1980s, competing in the World Pipe Band Championships, visiting the city regularly and later starting a relationship with a Scot which led her to relocate permanently.

References 

Year of birth missing (living people)
Living people
Place of birth missing (living people)
Lord Provosts of Glasgow
Scottish National Party councillors
Politicians from Stockholm
Swedish expatriates in Scotland
Swedish emigrants to the United Kingdom
Women councillors in Glasgow